Elsie Beatrice Shrigley (née Salling; 30 October 1899 – 13 May 1978), also known as Sally Shrigley, was an English vegan activist and a co-founder, along with Donald Watson, of The Vegan Society in 1944. She is credited, by some, as coining the word "vegan" with Watson.

Biography 
Shrigley was born in North London, in 1899, to a Swedish mother and Danish father. She married Walter Shrigley, a dentist, in 1939. Shrigley became a vegetarian in 1934 and stopped eating dairy from 1944. In August of the same year, Shrigley along with Donald Watson and others called for "a non-dairy section of the Vegetarian Society"; the rejection of this proposal from the society led to the formation of the vegan movement and the founding of The Vegan Society.

Shrigley was an honorary secretary of the Croydon Vegetarian Society from 1940 to 1958 and was later a secretary for the Surrey Vegetarian Society. She was also a temporary secretary for the London Vegetarian Society for three months. She was President of The Vegan Society in the early 1960s, then taking various other positions in the society; she served on its committee until her death.

She died in Tonbridge, Kent in 1978.

References 

1899 births
1978 deaths
British veganism activists
Organization founders
People from London